Jasper Ewing Brady (March 4, 1797 – January 26, 1871) was a Whig member of the U.S. House of Representatives from Pennsylvania.

Jasper E. Brady was born in Sunbury, Pennsylvania. He learned the hatter's trade and taught school in Franklin County, Pennsylvania. He studied law, was admitted to the bar in 1827 and commenced practice in Chambersburg, Pennsylvania. He served as treasurer of Franklin County, Pennsylvania, for three years. He was a member of the Pennsylvania House of Representatives in 1844 and 1845.

Brady was elected as a Whig to the Thirtieth Congress. He was an unsuccessful candidate for reelection in 1848. He moved to Pittsburgh, Pennsylvania, in September 1849 and resumed the practice of law. He served as a clerk in the office of the paymaster general in the War Department in Washington, D.C., from 1861 to 1869. He retired from active business pursuits in 1869 and resided in Washington, D.C., until his death in 1871. He was interred in City Cemetery in Sunbury, Pennsylvania, and later reinterred in Rock Creek Cemetery in Washington, D.C., in 1893.

Sources 
 
 The Political Graveyard

External links
 

Members of the Pennsylvania House of Representatives
Pennsylvania lawyers
People from Sunbury, Pennsylvania
People from Franklin County, Pennsylvania
American milliners
1797 births
1871 deaths
Burials at Rock Creek Cemetery
Whig Party members of the United States House of Representatives from Pennsylvania
19th-century American politicians
19th-century American lawyers